Mian Abbas Sharif (4 January 1953 – 11 January 2013) was a Pakistani politician and Tablighi Jamaat missionary who was the Member of the National Assembly of Pakistan from 1993 to 1997. He was the younger brother of Nawaz Sharif and Shehbaz Sharif.

Early life
Abbas was born on 4 January 1955 in Lahore, Pakistan. His father, Muhammad Sharif, was an upper-middle-class businessman and industrialist whose family had emigrated from Anantnag in Kashmir for business, and eventually settled in the village of Jati Umra in Amritsar district, Punjab, at the beginning of the twentieth century. His mother's family came from Pulwama. Following the partition of India and Pakistan's independence in 1947, his parents migrated from Amritsar to Lahore.

Family
Sharif was married to Sabiha Abbas. They had two sons, Aziz and Yousuf, and two daughters, Salma and Sara. His two brothers were Nawaz Sharif (a three-time former Prime Minister of Pakistan), and Shehbaz Sharif (the 23rd and current Prime Minister of Pakistan).

Political career
He was elected as the member of the National Assembly of Pakistan in the by-polls of 1993 Pakistani general election.

Death
Abbas died on 11 January 2013 at the age of 60 of a cardiac arrest.

References

2013 deaths
Punjabi people
Pakistan Muslim League (N) MNAs
Abbas Sharif
Pakistani MNAs 1993–1996
Pakistani people of Kashmiri descent
1956 births
Pakistani Sunni Muslims
Tablighi Jamaat people